Kathrin M. Moeslein (germ.: Kathrin M. Möslein) (born May 4, 1966) is a professor for business administration at the University of Erlangen-Nuremberg in Bavaria, Germany.

Biography 

Kathrin M. Möslein studied informatics with a minor in business administration at the Technical University Munich, Ludwig Maximilian University of Munich, and the Swiss Federal Institute of Technology Zurich. She graduated from Technical University Munich in 1993 and earned her Ph.D. in 1999. In 2004, she became professor for business administration at the same university. From 2003 to 2005, she contributed, as associate director, to the formation of the Advanced Institute of Management Research (AIM) at London Business School. In 2005, she was appointed to the Chair for Strategic Management and Organization at Leipzig Graduate School of Management (HHL) and contributed to the formation of the Center of Leading Innovation & Cooperation (CLIC) at HHL in 2006. As of 2007, Kathrin M. Möslein has been the head of the Chair of Information Systems I – Innovation and Value Creation at Friedrich Alexander University Erlangen-Nuremberg.

Research 

Kathrin M. Möslein has been researching and teaching in the field of strategic innovation, cooperation and leadership, as well as their IT-implementation within corporations. Her courses are about interactive value creation, innovation design, as well as the development and implementation of both innovation strategies and leadership systems. Since 2008, dean for research at the faculty of business economics at Friedrich Alexander University Erlangen-Nuremberg, and since 2010, research fellow at Leipzig Graduate School of Management as well as Visiting International Fellow at the Advanced Institute of Management Research (AIM) in London. Kathrin M. Möslein has been president and vice president of the European Academy of Management (EURAM), an organization she has co-founded, many times. For her achievements, she has accessed to a Fellowship of EURAM, a distinguished award granted by the EURAM College of Fellows coming with a substantial prize money financed by EURAM membership and conference fees.

Selected publications

 Möslein, K. M. & Matthaei, E. E.: Strategies for innovators: HHL Open School Case Book Wiesbaden: Gabler Verlag 2009

External links 
Publication list of Kathrin M. Moeslein
Kathrin M. Moeslein
Chair of Innovation Systems I - Innovation and Value Creation - University of Erlangen-Nuremberg 
Center for Leading Innovation and Cooperation (CLIC)
Advanced Institute of Management Research (AIM)
European Academy of Management (EURAM)

German economists
German women economists
Technical University of Munich alumni
Academic staff of the University of Erlangen-Nuremberg
1966 births
Living people